Nebria lareyniei is a species of ground beetle in the Nebriinae subfamily that can be found on the island of Corsica, near  France.

References

External links
Nebria lareyniei at Fauna Europaea

Beetles of Europe
Beetles described in 1858
Endemic fauna of Corsica
lareyniei